The Aglaé was a 32-gun frigate of the French Navy, built to a design by P. Duhamel.

Service

During the Revolutionary wars, she was used to ferry troops to the Caribbean, and spent two years on station at  Saint Domingue. In 1793, she undertook a refit, after which she was renamed Fraternité.

Under lieutenant de vaisseau Gourrège, she cruised off Spain, and later she took part in the Battle of Groix on 23 June 1795 under lieutenant de vaisseau Florinville.

During the winter 1796, she took part in the Croisière du Grand Hiver under vice-admiral Morard de Galles. On 30 December, she helped Révolution in rescuing the crew of Scevola, which foundered in the tempest off Ireland. Fraternité returned to Rochefort on 14 January 1797.

On 22 September 1798, Captain Louis-Marie Le Gouardun took command, until 5 October of the same year.

Fate
She was lost at sea in August 1802, as she sailed from Saint Domingue to France.

Notes and references 
 References

 Bibliography
 
 
  (1671-1870)
 

Age of Sail frigates of France
Ships built in France
1788 ships
Frigates of the French Navy